The long-tailed pocket mouse (Chaetodipus formosus) is a species of rodent in the family Heteromyidae.
It is found in Arizona, California, Nevada and Utah in the United States and Baja California in Mexico.

References

Patton, J. L. 2005. Family Heteromyidae. pp. 844–858 in Mammal Species of the World a Taxonomic and Geographic Reference. D. E. Wilson and D. M. Reeder eds. Johns Hopkins University Press, Baltimore.

Chaetodipus
Mammals of Mexico
Mammals of the United States
Mammals described in 1889
Taxonomy articles created by Polbot